Greg (or Gregory) Taylor may refer to:

 Greg "Fingers" Taylor (born 1951), American musician
 Greg Taylor (author) (born 1951), American children's and young-adult book author
 Greg Taylor (English footballer) (born 1990), Cambridge United FC player
 Greg Taylor (politician), Indiana senator
 Greg Taylor (public servant), Australian senior public servant
 Greg Taylor (Scottish footballer) (born 1997), Celtic FC player
 Gregory Taylor (cricketer) (born 1987), Bahamian cricketer
 Gregory W. Taylor, between 2014 and 2016 the Chief Public Officer of Health of Canada

See also
Grigor Taylor (born 1943), Australian film actor